Piloo Reporter (born 24 September 1938) is an Indian former international cricket umpire.

His first match as umpire in a domestic Ranji Trophy match was at the age of 29. In 1984, he made his debut at the international stage as an umpire in both Test matches and one day internationals (ODI), standing in 14 Tests and 22 ODI's until 1994. Piloo Reporter is a Parsi and is known as "PD" in the cricketing fraternity. The method by which Reporter signaled a boundary has been called "Milkshake" by cricket commentator Henry Blofeld.

In 1986, Reporter and VK Ramaswamy became the first neutral umpires from India when they stood in a Test match featuring Pakistan and West Indies in Lahore. This was the first time neutral umpires had officiated in a Test since 1912. They were invited by the Pakistan captain, Imran Khan after allegations of bias by Pakistani umpires. Reporter was the only Indian umpire to officiate in the 1992 Cricket World Cup. A biography has been written on him, An Umpire Remembers.

In 1993, Reporter was allegedly paid to give his assessment of the pitch prior to a test in Calcutta to bookie Mukesh Gupta.

Umpire Reporter's sister, Madhumati, was an actress in Bollywood movies. She mostly acted in dance numbers as she was very famous as a dancer.

See also
 List of Test cricket umpires
 List of One Day International cricket umpires

References

External links
"The fearless Indian scourge of chucking" by V Ramnarayan

1938 births
Living people
Indian Test cricket umpires
Indian One Day International cricket umpires
Parsi people